Laoküla is a village in Lääne-Harju Parish, Harju County in northern Estonia. It is bordered to the north by the city of Paldiski.

The borders of the village extend beyond current dwellings, and so its area is home to several abandoned buildings and their ruins; some from the Soviet era, and some from before.

In popular culture
On the outskirts of Laoküla, a derelict building is stood near the shore, and it has served as a setting in two music videos:

In January 2008, Estonian rap group Def Räädu released their video to "Vaatenurga turist", prominently featuring the derelict in the second half of the video.

In late 2015, the same ruins were featured in the last scene of a music video to "Faded", a song by Norwegian DJ Alan Walker. Over time, "Faded" became the 21st most-viewed video on YouTube, with over 2.8 billion views as of October 2020.

Transit
Laoküla has a station on the Elron western route.

References

Villages in Harju County